Joseph Benton Sandham (1871–1948) was an English footballer who played at centre-forward for Stoke, Crewe Alexandra, Burslem Port Vale, and Dresden United.

Career
Sandham began his career at Stoke, before moving on to Crewe Alexandra without making a league appearance for the club. The "Railwaymen" finished 12th in the 15 team Second Division in the 1893–94 season, before finishing bottom of the Football League in 1894–95. He joined the other major club in the area, Burslem Port Vale, in January 1896. He scored on his Second Division debut in a 2–2 draw with Burton Wanderers at the Athletic Ground on 18 January 1896. He played a further five games (three in the Football League) and scored another league goal against Rotherham Town, but lost his place in February 1896 and was released at the end of the season. He moved on to Dresden United.

Career statistics
Source:

References

1871 births
1948 deaths
Sportspeople from Newcastle-under-Lyme
English footballers
Association football forwards
Stoke City F.C. players
Crewe Alexandra F.C. players
Port Vale F.C. players
Dresden United F.C. players
English Football League players